The United States' recognition of the Armenian genocide is the American formal recognition that the deportation and massacre of Armenians by the Ottoman Empire during the First World War constituted genocide. The United States recognizes the Armenian genocide through two congressional resolutions passed by both houses of the United States Congress, and by presidential announcement. The House of Representatives passed a resolution with broad support on October 29, 2019, and the Senate did the same by unanimous consent on December 12, 2019, making the recognition of the Armenian genocide part of the policy of the United States. Before 2019, there were numerous proposed resolutions in Congress to recognize the Armenian genocide, all failing to receive enough support.

On 22 April 1981, President Ronald Reagan first referred to the events as a "genocide" in a comparison to the Holocaust. On April 24, 2021, the Armenian Genocide Remembrance Day, President Joe Biden referred to the events as "genocide" in a statement released by the White House, in which the President formally equated the genocide perpetrated against Armenians with atrocities on the scale of those committed in Nazi-occupied Europe.

Background

History

Early attempts 
On 22 April 1981, President Ronald Reagan referred to the events as a "genocide" in a statement about the Holocaust, saying "Like the genocide of the Armenians before it ... the lessons of the Holocaust must never be forgotten".

2007 resolution
On October 10, 2007, the United States House Committee on Foreign Affairs approved a resolution that would have recognized the Armenian genocide by a vote of 27–21. The resolution did not receive support from President George W. Bush, who said that the resolution's "passage would do great harm to our relations with a key ally in NATO and in the global war on terror." Despite presidential opposition, House Speaker Nancy Pelosi said that the resolution would receive a full House vote. In the days that followed, the Turkish government and lobbyists on their behalf, such as Dick Gephardt and Bob Livingston, successfully worked to get several of the resolution's co-sponsors to withdraw their support. However, on October 25, the bill's supporters withdrew the bill.

On October 11, 2007, regarding a proposed U.S. House resolution 106, the Speaker of the United States House of Representatives Nancy Pelosi said that the measure would be brought to a vote because "While that may have been a long time ago, genocide is taking place now in Darfur, it did within recent memory in Rwanda, so as long as there is genocide there is need to speak out against it ..." However, later she was forced to backtrack from a pledge to bring the measure for a vote because of a waning support for this resolution, since many believe that "angering Turkey would hamper efforts in Iraq". A 2015 version of the resolution had 212 co-sponsors, compared to 236 co-sponsors, which it had in early 2007.

Opposition
The bill has been opposed by the Republic of Turkey, as well as the administration of former U.S. President George W. Bush. U.S. Secretary of State Condoleezza Rice urged U.S. lawmakers to drop the resolution. She said: "I continue to believe that the passage of the ... Armenian genocide resolution would severely harm our relationships with Turkey". While a candidate, U.S. President Barack Obama stated that he "stood with the Armenian American community in calling for Turkey's acknowledgment of the Armenian Genocide", but his Secretary of State Hillary Clinton assured Turkey that the White House opposes the resolution. Eight former U.S. secretaries of state, both Republican and Democrat, signed a petition calling for refraining from passing this resolution.

Gregory Meeks, a Democratic representative from New York in the United States House Committee on Foreign Affairs, voted against the resolution, arguing that Congress should focus on the failings of U.S. history, such as slavery or the killings of Native Americans, before it starts condemning the histories of other countries. He said, "We have failed to do what we're asking other people to do ... We have got to clean up our own house."
 
Zbigniew Brzezinski, a former U.S. national security adviser, stated in an interview to CNN:
 
As far as a resolution is concerned, I never realized that the House of Representatives was some sort of an academy of learning that passes judgment on historical events. History's full of terrible crimes, and there is no doubt that many Armenians were massacred in World War I. But whether the House of Representatives should be passing resolutions whether that should be classified as genocide or a huge massacre is I don't think any of its business. It has nothing to do with passing laws, how to run the United States. That's where the constitution created the House of Representatives for.
 
Former U.S. President Jimmy Carter also stated in an interview to CNN: "I think if I was in Congress I would not vote for it."

The resolution also received negative reactions in mass media. Richmond Times-Dispatch columnist expressed his surprise that "a Congress that has historically lacked the spine or heart to tackle the nation's ugliest legacies in a meaningful way is censuring Turkey". The newspaper quotes Robert J. Miller, a professor at Lewis & Clark Law School in Portland, Ore., who called it "unbelievable" that Congress is pointing fingers elsewhere while ignoring a U.S. history of black enslavement and the destruction and displacement of Indians.

Turkish ambassador Nabi Şensoy stated: "[genocide] is the greatest accusation of all against humanity ... You cannot expect any nation to accept that kind of labeling." According to the Washington Post, to defeat the initiative for the resolution, the Turkish government "is spending more than $300,000 a month on communications specialists and high-powered lobbyists, including former congressman Bob Livingston". Turkish politician  realized that even the opponents of the resolution recognized the fact of the genocide, which he found "unbearable".

Support
According to Newsweek:

 
"The Armenian Genocide resolution is a proper test for American democracy. It will uncover priorities of the United States – good relations with Turkey or historical truth", Russian State Duma member, Konstantin Zatulin told a news conference in Yerevan on 21 October 2007.

Previous presidents
While campaigning to become president in 2008, Barack Obama promised to recognize the Armenian genocide. However, Obama refused to describe the 1915 events as a genocide throughout his presidency.

2019 congressional recognition 
On April 8, 2019, Representatives Adam Schiff and Gus Bilirakis introduced a resolution in the House of Representatives, alongside other Democratic and Republican representatives, that would make it the policy of the United States to recognize the Armenian genocide, reject its denial, and educate the public on the genocide. The next day, Senators Bob Menendez and Ted Cruz introduced a similar resolution in the Senate, with 14 other co-sponsors, including Democratic leader Chuck Schumer. On October 29, 2019, the House of Representatives voted 405–11 to recognize the Armenian genocide. A few months later, on December 12, the Senate passed a similar resolution by unanimous consent. Despite congressional recognition, the Donald Trump administration rejected the resolutions, with U.S. State Department spokesperson Morgan Ortagus saying, "The position of the administration has not changed."

Presidential announcement

On April 24, 2021, Armenian Genocide Remembrance Day, President Joe Biden declared that the United States considers the events "genocide" in a statement released by the White House, in which the president formally equated the genocide perpetrated against Armenians with atrocities on the scale of those committed in Nazi-occupied Europe.

Mississippi recognition 
In March 2022, Mississippi became the 50th and final U.S. state to formally recognize the Armenian genocide following a statement by Governor Tate Reeves.

See also 
 Armenian genocide recognition

References

External links
 The Murder of a Nation by Henry Morgenthau, Sr.
 Armenian genocide history
 The Centennial of the Armenian Genocide

2007 in American law
2007 in Armenia
2019 in law
2019 in American politics
2019 in Armenia
116th United States Congress
Armenian genocide commemoration
Armenia–United States relations
Turkey–United States relations
Amenian Genocide